Sahlins is a surname. Notable people with the surname include:

Bernard Sahlins (1922–2013), American writer, director, and comedian
Marshall Sahlins (1930–2021), American anthropologist
Peter Sahlins (born 1957), American historian

See also
Sahlin